is a retired Japanese professional baseball player from Numazu, Shizuoka, Japan. He played for the Seibu Lions, Hanshin Tigers, Osaka Kintetsu Buffaloes, and Yokohama BayStars during his 10-year career in the Japanese professional leagues.

Sugiyama was drafted in the first round of the 1992 amateur draft by the Seibu Lions, and won the Japanese rookie of the year award in 1993, making 54 appearances with a 2.80 ERA. His pitching deteriorated from then on, and he was traded to the Hanshin Tigers in mid-1999. He was traded to the Osaka Kintetsu Buffaloes in mid-2000, and was traded for the third time in his career in mid-2001 to the Yokohama BayStars. He made 32 appearances with the BayStars in 2001, but retired at the end of the season.

He worked as a batting pitcher for the BayStars before becoming the pitching coach for the Tohoku Rakuten Golden Eagles in 2006.

He won a bronze medal in the 1992 Summer Olympics before entering the Japanese professional leagues.

External links
 Career statistics

1968 births
Living people
People from Numazu, Shizuoka
Baseball players at the 1992 Summer Olympics
Olympic baseball players of Japan
Olympic bronze medalists for Japan
Nippon Professional Baseball pitchers
Seibu Lions players
Hanshin Tigers players
Osaka Kintetsu Buffaloes players
Yokohama BayStars players
Nippon Professional Baseball Rookie of the Year Award winners
Olympic medalists in baseball
Japanese baseball coaches
Nippon Professional Baseball coaches
Medalists at the 1992 Summer Olympics